C67 or C-67 may refer to:
 Berlin Defence (chess), a chess opening
 Bladder cancer
 Caldwell 67, a barred spiral galaxy
 Caudron C.67, a French biplane
 Douglas C-67 Dragon, an American transport aircraft
 Hours of Work and Rest Periods (Road Transport) Convention, 1939 of the International Labour Organization